Menyamya District is a district of the Morobe Province of Papua New Guinea.  Its capital is Menyamya.  The population of the district was 87,209 at the 2011 census. The current Member of Parliament for Menyamya in the Eleventh National Parliament is the Honorable Solen Loifa, MP

References

Districts of Papua New Guinea
Morobe Province